Native Sons is the sixth and final studio album (and seventh overall release) by singer-songwriter duo Loggins and Messina, released in January 1976. It was a departure from previous recordings owing to the presence of string sections, stronger emphasis on flute, minimized use of saxophone, downplayed country influences and Jim Messina's signature guitar work was barely in evidence. After a final concert in Hawaii, the duo quietly went their separate ways. The Messina-penned rock and roll song "Boogie Man" was later covered by Australian rock band The Blue Echoes.

Track listing

Side one
"Sweet Marie" (Jim Messina) – 3:04 (lead singer: Jim Messina)
"Pretty Princess" (Messina, Murray MacLeod) – 6:57 (lead singers: Larry Sims, Jim Messina)
"My Lady, My Love" (Kenny Loggins) – 3:00 (lead singer: Kenny Loggins)
"When I Was a Child" (Messina) – 4:18 (lead singer: Jim Messina)
"Wasting Our Time" (K. Loggins, John Townsend) – 2:50 (lead singer: Kenny Loggins)

Side two
"Peacemaker" (Loggins, Townsend, Ed Sanford) – 5:03 (lead singer: Kenny Loggins)
"It's Alright" (Messina, MacLeod) – 4:00 (lead singer: Jim Messina; spoken introduction: Barry Sullivan-actor)
"Boogie Man" (Messina) – 2:01 (lead singer: Jim Messina)
"Fox Fire" (Loggins) – 2:58 (lead singer: Kenny Loggins)
"Native Son" (Loggins, Dan Loggins) – 4:10 (lead singer: Kenny Loggins)

Personnel
Kenny Loggins – lead and backing vocals, rhythm guitar and acoustic guitar, harmonica
Jim Messina – lead and backing vocals, lead guitar, acoustic guitar, dobro
John Townsend – backing vocals
Ed Sanford – backing vocals
Murray MacLeod – vocals, backing vocals
Merel Bregante – drums, timbales
Jon Clarke – flute, English horn, oboe, baritone, bass, soprano and tenor saxophone, soprano recorder
Vince Denham – flute, bass clarinet, alto, soprano and tenor saxophone
Steve Forman – percussion, vibraphone
Richard Greene – fiddle, mandolin, mandocello
Milt Holland – percussion
Larry Sims – bass, backing vocals
Don Roberts – clarinet, alto flute, alto, baritone, soprano and tenor saxophone
Mike Rubini – keyboards

Production
Producer: Jim Messina
Engineer: Alex Kazanegras
2nd engineer: Jim Messina
Recordist: Corey Bailey
Recording technician: Lew Schatzer
Recorded on location with Haji Sound
Photography: Ed Caraeff
Copper frame: Nick Fasciano
Design: Ron Coro
Handwriting: Virginia Team

Charts
Album – Billboard (United States)

References 

Loggins and Messina albums
1976 albums
Albums produced by Jim Messina (musician)
Columbia Records albums
Albums recorded in a home studio